opened in Senkō-ji Park in Onomichi, Hiroshima Prefecture, Japan, in 1980. The Museum reopened to a design by Tadao Ando in 2003.

The museum has become notable on the Internet for being visited on a regular basis by two cats, whom the museum guards have to repeatedly turn away due to the museum's strict "no animals" policy.

See also
 Nakata Museum
 List of Cultural Properties of Japan - paintings (Hiroshima)

References

External links
  Onomichi City Museum of Art
  Onomichi City Museum of Art
  Collection

Museums in Hiroshima Prefecture
Onomichi, Hiroshima
Art museums and galleries in Japan
Art museums established in 1980
1980 establishments in Japan
Tadao Ando buildings